Katzenfurt is a village (Ortsteil) of the municipality of Ehringshausen.
The name does not mean Katze (cat), but the name comes from the Chatten or Katten, an ancient Germanic tribe. Its first documented reference was in 1233 via Heinricus de Kaczenfurt, who was named as a witness to a sale of the estates to Grossholzheim and Kleinholzheim by Hartrad von Merenberg to Arnsburg Abbey.

References

External links
 Website Town

Villages in Hesse
Lahn-Dill-Kreis